The 15th Air Transport Wing is a wing in the Air Component of the Belgian Armed Forces. The 15th Wing's motto is TENACITY, which means; 'the quality or fact of being able to grip something firmly / persistence, determination, perseverance' A Sioux Indian chief completes the emblem.

The wing comprises two operational squadrons, the 21st Squadron and the 20th Squadron, and a Training & Conversion Unit. 21st Squadron is also known as the Liaison and Long-Haul Flight. It currently operates several types of aircraft: one Airbus A321, two Dassault Falcon 7X (rented from Abelag Aviation). 20th Squadron operates 7 Lockheed C-130 Hercules military transport aircraft which are currently being replaced by the Airbus A400M Atlas. It consists of about 72 crewmembers, making it one of the largest units in the Belgian Air Component.

External links
Belgian Ministry of Defence, Section of the website about the 15th Air Transport Wing

Wings of Belgium
15th Air Transport Wing
Air force transport wings
Military units and formations established in 1946